Andrew Swift may refer to:
 Andrew Swift (bishop)
 Andrew Swift (singer)